Rumen Panayotov (born ) is a Bulgarian wheelchair curler.

Teams

References

External links 

Living people
1954 births
Bulgarian male curlers
Bulgarian wheelchair curlers